Gassicurtia is a genus of lichenized fungi in the family Caliciaceae.

Taxonomy
The genus was circumscribed by French botanist Antoine Laurent Apollinaire Fée in Essai Crypt. Exot. (Paris) 1: XLVI, 100 in 1825. 

The genus name of Gassicurtia is in honour of Louis Claude Cadet de Gassicourt (1731–1799) who was a French chemist who synthesised the first organometalic compound.

It was later resurrected by Bernhard Marbach in his 2000 monograph on Buellia sensu lato. The genus contains species that are part of the tropical Buellia group with 2-celled ascospores, and which lack algae in the margin.

Species
, Species Fungorum accepts 30 species in the genus Gassicurtia:

Gassicurtia acidobaeomyceta  (2000)
Gassicurtia albomarginata  (2016)
Gassicurtia bellardii  (2000)
Gassicurtia blencoensis  (2016) – Australia
Gassicurtia capricornica  (2016) – Australia
Gassicurtia caririensis  (2014) – Brazil
Gassicurtia catasema  (2000)
Gassicurtia chermesina  (2000)
Gassicurtia clathrisidiata  (2007) – Thailand
Gassicurtia coccifera  (2000)
Gassicurtia coccinea  (1825)
Gassicurtia coccinoides  (2000)
Gassicurtia dodecaspora  (2000)
Gassicurtia elizae  (2000)
Gassicurtia endococcinea  (2017) – Brazil
Gassicurtia ferruginascens  (2000)
Gassicurtia gallowayi  (2015) – Australia
Gassicurtia jamesii  (2018) – New Zealand
Gassicurtia manguensia  (2000)
Gassicurtia marbachii  (2009)
Gassicurtia nordinii  (2009)
Gassicurtia omiae  (2009)
Gassicurtia pseudosubpulchella  (2000)
Gassicurtia restingiana  (2020) – Brazil
Gassicurtia rhizocarpoides  (2018) – Brazil
Gassicurtia rubromarginata  (2014) – Brazil
Gassicurtia rufofuscescens  (2000)
Gassicurtia subpulchella  (2000)
Gassicurtia vaccinii  (2000)
Gassicurtia vernicoma  (2000)
Gassicurtia victoriana  (2015) – Australia

References

Cited literature

Caliciales
Caliciales genera
Lichen genera
Taxa described in 1845
Taxa named by Antoine Laurent Apollinaire Fée